I Can See Your Voice is an American music game show that premiered on Fox on September 23, 2020. It is an adaptation of the South Korean series, and is hosted by Korean-American comedian Ken Jeong. The series has been renewed for a third season, and started filming in October 2022.

Format
Presented with a group of six "secret singers" identified only by their occupation, a contestant must attempt to eliminate bad singers from the group without ever hearing them sing, assisted by clues and a celebrity panel over the course of six rounds. The contestant must eliminate one singer at the end of each of the first five rounds, receiving $15,000 ($10,000 in season one) if they eliminate a bad singer.

 In the first two rounds, the "Lip Sync Challenge", the singers are divided into two groups of three, and participate in a lip sync performance to one song each. The bad singers mime to a recording by someone else, and the good singers mime to a recording of their own performance.
 In season two, this round is conducted as the "Lip Sync Showdown", and is now performed with three groups of two singers each. In addition, the contestant may use the "Golden Mic" once during the rounds, during which they may hear additional clues and observations from a celebrity guest off-stage.
 In the first season, "Unlock My Life" was played as the third round, where the contestant is presented a video package relating to one of the four remaining singers of their choice. This was followed by "Secret Studio", where the contestant is presented with video from a recording session by one of the three remaining singers of their choice, but pitch-shifted to obscure their actual vocals.
 In the second season, the third and fourth rounds are conducted with two of three rotating formats:
 "A Day in the Life", where the contestant is presented with a video package chronicling the daily lives of one of the remaining singers.
 "Super Fan", where the contestant is presented with a video package featuring a "super fan" of one of the remaining singers.
 "Secret Snoop", where the contestant "tours" the remaining singers' homes for clues (which may include red herrings) for 60 seconds.
 The final round is the "Interrogation", where the contestant may ask questions of the two remaining singers for 60 seconds. The good singers are required to give truthful responses, while the bad singers must lie.

At the end of the game, the contestant may either end the game and keep the money they had won in previous rounds, or risk it for a chance to win $100,000 by correctly guessing whether the last remaining singer is good or not, as revealed by means of a duet between the singer and one of the celebrity panelists.

Production
Fox first announced the series during the Television Critics Association' January 2020 press tour; Ken Jeong (who serves as a panelist on The Masked Singer, Fox's adaptation of another South Korean format) served as host for the pilot. Fox ordered I Can See Your Voice to series in February 2020, with Jeong serving as a co-executive producer alongside The Masked Singer executive producer Craig Plestis, and James McKinlay.

One episode was completed before production was halted due to the COVID-19 pandemic (with the series not being aired in production order, the episode was aired later in the season). Fox resumed production with no audience under enhanced safety protocols in August 2020, becoming one of the network's first non-scripted series to do so. On August 26, 2020, Fox announced that singer Adrienne Houghton and actress Cheryl Hines would serve as regular celebrity panelists.

On January 27, 2021, it was announced that the series had been renewed for a second season, scheduled to air later in the year. On November 8, 2021, it was announced that the second season would begin with a holiday special on December 14, 2021, ahead of its timeslot premiere on January 5, 2022.

Series overview

Episodes

Season 1 (2020)

Season 2 (2022)

Specials

Broadcast and release
On August 26, 2020, Fox announced that I Can See Your Voice would premiere on September 23, following the fourth season premiere of The Masked Singer. It is available for streaming on Fox's ad-supported streaming service Tubi.

The series was acquired by Global in Canada.

On September 10, 2021, the first series is aired in New Zealand's TVNZ 2 every Friday.

References

External links
 
 

I Can See Your Voice (American game show)
2020s American game shows
2020s American music television series
2020s American reality television series
2020 American television series debuts
American television series based on South Korean television series
English-language television shows
Fox Broadcasting Company original programming
Television productions suspended due to the COVID-19 pandemic
Television series by Fox Entertainment